Birmingham International may refer to:

 Birmingham Airport, formerly known as Birmingham International Airport in Birmingham, England
 Birmingham International railway station, in Birmingham, England
 Birmingham-Shuttlesworth International Airport, in Birmingham, Alabama
 Birmingham International Carnival, a biennial event in Birmingham, England
 Birmingham International Raceway, a former race track in Birmingham, Alabama
 Birmingham International Holdings, company